George Dundas, Lord Manor (19 November 1802 – 7 October 1869) was a Scottish Senator of the College of Justice.

Life
He was born on 19 November 1802, the son of James Dundas of Ochtertyre, Stirlingshire, founder of the major Scottish legal firm Dundas & Wilson, and his wife Elizabeth Graham of Portmore. His siblings included David Dundas (1799–1877), Privy Counsellor, Ralph James Dundas (1795–1824) and John Dundas (1803–1873), all lawyers. William Dundas (1796–1842) died at Niagara Falls.

Dundas was descended from Dundas of Manour, and adopted the title Lord Manour when raised to a law lord, but quickly changed this to Lord Manor. He resided at Ochtertyre House, coming to Edinburgh solely for his legal work.

In 1868 Dundas was placed in the Outer House of the College of Justice with David Mure, Lord Mure and Charles Baillie, Lord Jerviswoode. He died on 7 October 1869, found dead in his Edinburgh home at 9 Charlotte Square. He is buried in Warriston Cemetery on the north side of the main east–west path.

Family

He married Elizabeth Mackenzie, daughter of Colin Mackenzie of Portmore. They had five sons:

William John Dundas FRSE
Cpt James Dundas VC
 Colin Mackenzie Dundas (twin to James) Commander in the Royal Navy (1842–1902)
David Dundas, Lord Dundas KC
 George Ralph Dundas

His great-grandson William John Dundas RN (1923–1965) was one of the three survivors of the sinking of HMS Hood in 1941.

Arms

References

1802 births
1869 deaths
19th-century Scottish judges
Senators of the College of Justice
People from Perth and Kinross